The Lal Bahadur Shastri College of Advanced Maritime Studies and Research also known as LBS College of Advanced Maritime Studies and Research is a post-sea Maritime Education and Training Institute offering a range of courses for Merchant Navy Officers. The college was established by the Ministry of Transport, Government of India, in 1948.

References
 https://sites.google.com/imu.ac.in/lbsmumbaicourses/home
 L.B.S. College of Advanced Maritime Studies and Research - Official Web Site
 List of courses

Maritime colleges in India
Universities and colleges in Mumbai
Memorials to Lal Bahadur Shastri
Educational institutions established in 1948
1948 establishments in Bombay State
Research institutes established in 1948